Bovens is a Dutch surname. Notable people with the surname include:

 Luc Bovens (born 1963), Belgian philosopher
 Mark Bovens (born 1957), Dutch public administration scholar
 Theo Bovens (born 1959), Dutch politician

Dutch-language surnames